Veliče Šumulikoski (born 24 April 1981) is a Macedonian former football midfielder. He is the third most capped player of all time of the North Macedonia national football team. He is the director of football for Czech club Slovácko.

Club career
On 29 January 2008, Šumulikoski signed for Ipswich Town from Turkish club Bursaspor for a fee believed to be in the region of £650,000, potentially rising to over £1 million depending on appearances. Šumulikoski received his work permit on the following day but only received international clearance on 2 February 2008 after a delay by the Turkish FA. He made his debut later that day coming off the bench in Ipswich's 2–1 away win against Sheffield Wednesday. On 16 February 2008, he scored his first goal for Ipswich in his first home start for the club, his fourth appearance overall, in a 2–1 win over Blackpool F.C.

On 4 August 2009, he signed for Preston North End on a three-year deal for fee in the region of £400,000 by manager Alan Irvine. Šumulikoski only made 15 appearances for Preston, including nine starts, and failed to appear after Irvine was fired in December 2009 and replaced by Darren Ferguson. Preston agreed a settlement to release Šumulikoski from the remainder of his contract in May 2010. After his release, he briefly trained with newly promoted Championship side, Leeds United.

Crystal Palace manager George Burley decided not to permanently sign Šumulikoski after he played in two trial matches. In August 2010, he signed for Russian side Sibir Novosibirsk.  He was voted to become captain of Sibir by his teammates prior to the start of the 2011 season.

In February 2012, Šumulikoski signed for Chinese club Tianjin Teda F.C. He made his official debut for Tianjin on 25 February, in a 2-1 CFA Super Cup defeat against Guangzhou Evergrande. Tianjin Teda agreed a settlement to release Šumulikoski from the remainder of his contract in January 2013. Šumulikoski back in Czech Republic to sign for 1. FC Slovácko.

International career
He made his senior debut for Macedonia in a July 2000 friendly match against Azerbaijan and has earned a total of 84 caps, scoring 1 goal. His final international was a June 2013 friendly against Norway.

References

External links
 
 Profile at MacedonianFootball 
 
 Profile at Slovacko official web 

1981 births
Living people
Sportspeople from Struga
Association football midfielders
Macedonian footballers
North Macedonia under-21 international footballers
North Macedonia international footballers
NK Celje players
1. FC Slovácko players
FC Zenit Saint Petersburg players
Bursaspor footballers
Ipswich Town F.C. players
Preston North End F.C. players
FC Sibir Novosibirsk players
Tianjin Jinmen Tiger F.C. players
Slovenian PrvaLiga players
Czech First League players
Russian Premier League players
Süper Lig players
English Football League players
Russian First League players
Chinese Super League players
Macedonian expatriate footballers
Expatriate footballers in Slovenia
Macedonian expatriate sportspeople in Slovenia
Expatriate footballers in the Czech Republic
Macedonian expatriate sportspeople in the Czech Republic
Expatriate footballers in Russia
Macedonian expatriate sportspeople in Russia
Expatriate footballers in Turkey
Macedonian expatriate sportspeople in Turkey
Expatriate footballers in England
Macedonian expatriate sportspeople in England
Expatriate footballers in China
Macedonian expatriate sportspeople in China